Les Femmes collantes is a French film released in 1938, directed by Pierre Caron. It is based on the 1886 opéra bouffe of the same name by Léon Gandillot, and was preceded by a 1920 film written by Gandillot and directed by Georges Monca with Charles Prince.

Plot 
Jacques Badinois is a wealthy lawyer with three women bent on marrying him: his mistress, a young widow, and his maid. He and his clerk's intended fiancée then fall in love. He gives all four women the same date and time for their wedding, and marries her.

Cast 
 Henri Garat : Jacques Badinois
 Josseline Gaël : Eloïse Duboucher
 Betty Stockfeld : Gladys Grey
 Mona Goya : Rose, the Badinois maid
 Pierre Stéphen : Hippolyte Loupiot, Badinois' clerk
 Armand Bernard : 	Séraphin Campluchard, undertaker
 Marguerite Moreno : Madame Mourillon
  : Monique Mourillon
 Marcel Vallée : Joseph Mourillon
 Jeanne Fusier-Gir : the Mourillon maid
 Jean Tissier : Claude Patrice, fashion designer
 Marcel Pérès : bailiff
 Albert Duvaleix	
 Marie Cruz
 Willy Léardy	
 Monique Monnier

Release 
Les Femmes collantes opened in Paris on 27 April 1938. It was re-released on video in 2015 by René Chateau Vidéo.

References

External links 
 

French comedy films
Operetta films
French black-and-white films
Films directed by Pierre Caron
1938 romantic comedy films
1930s French films